
This is a list of properties and historic districts that are listed on the National Register of Historic Places (NRHP) in Puerto Rico. There are 368 NRHP listings in Puerto Rico, with one or more NRHP listings in each of Puerto Rico's 78 municipalities.

For convenience, the list has been divided into six regions:

 National Register of Historic Places listings in western Puerto Rico
 National Register of Historic Places listings in southern Puerto Rico
 National Register of Historic Places listings in northern Puerto Rico
 National Register of Historic Places listings in central Puerto Rico
 National Register of Historic Places listings in eastern Puerto Rico
 National Register of Historic Places listings in San Juan, Puerto Rico

Current listings by municipality

See also

 List of lighthouses in Puerto Rico
 List of bridges on the National Register of Historic Places in Puerto Rico

Notes

External links

 Puerto Rico State Historic Preservation Office 
 National Park Service, National Register of Historic Places site

Historic sites in Puerto Rico

Cultural history of Puerto Rico